Pari temple is a 14th-century Hindu candi (temple) located approximately 2 kilometers northwest from Sidoarjo mud flow. This red brick structure is located in Candi Pari village, Porong subdistrict, Sidoarjo Regency, East Java Indonesia.

On top of the gate, there is a carved stone inscription with date 1293 Saka or corresponds to 1371 CE, dated from Majapahit period during the reign Hayam Wuruk (r. 1350-1389).

See also 

 Trowulan
 Jawi Temple
 Jabung
 Gunung Gangsir

References

External links 

Pari
Majapahit
Cultural Properties of Indonesia in East Java